Bigbank is an Estonian bank which headquarters are located in Tallinn, Estonia. The bank is focusing on loans. The bank operates in Baltic States, Bulgaria, Finland and Sweden and to some extent in Germany, Austria and Netherlands.

The bank is established in 1992.

385 people are working at this bank.

See also
Bigbank Tartu (volleyball club)

References

External links

Banks of Estonia